Songs People Actually Liked – Volume 1 – The First 10 Years (1994–2003) is  compilation album by American rock band Bowling for Soup, released on January 27, 2015.  The compilation was completely fan-funded, as well as being released on the band's own record label like their previous albums. The band celebrates their 20th anniversary on June 4, 2014, and for a birthday present Bowling For Soup decided to re-record an album of their best and best-known songs partly in response to a "Best Of" hits released by their former record label, that was created without the band's knowledge of and or any input. The album  also contains 17 re-recordings of songs from their low-budget albums and one new song.

Production and recording
On February 17, 2014, the band announced they teamed up with PledgeMusic again, this time to launch a fully fan-funded campaign to record a greatest hits album. The band would be reaching their 20th anniversary later that year and the album would cover the band's first 10 years together. The album was to contain re-recordings of 17 songs plus one new one. Like their previous Pledge campaign, exclusive pre-order items would include shirts, posters, autographed items, and lithographs. The campaign would also include the rare "Drunk Enough To Dance Demos" CD and a book of every Bowling For Soup song lyrics hand-written lyrics with commentary and notes.  5% of the pledges would again be donated to Sweet Relief an organization that provides financial assistance to all types of career musicians who are struggling to make ends meet while facing illness, disability, or age-related problems. The band would post monthly updates to their pledgers throughout the process. The track listing was announced with a total listing of 18 songs which included the title for their new song "20 years (That's A Lot Of Beer)" and "Shut Up And Smile" which ended up not being included on the final release, instead the song "Suckerpunch" was. In June and July the band would perform several dates at Warped Tour and at Download Fest. A video announcement from Chandler gave news that the album was going to be delayed due to a injury he received. Because of Erik's injury The album was supposed to be released in June to commemorate their 20th anniversary but would be pushed back to January 2015. A October 2014 update showed Burney recording guitar solos for "Thirteen" and "Cody". Vocals were also recorded and artwork was being approved that month. Vocals, mixing and mastering were being finished in November.   Reddick informed pledgers that they wanted lyric videos for every song from the album and asked fans to choose a songs and submit it. If the submission was chosen and allowed it would be posted on BFStv and the winners would be sent at least $100 in free goodies. Over a year had past since the project began when on May 20, 2015 the commentary for each track was given to pledgers.

Track listing

Personnel
 Jaret Reddick – lead vocals, guitar
 Chris Burney – guitar, backing vocals
 Erik Chandler – bass, backing vocals
 Gary Wiseman – drums, backing vocals
Production 
 Executive Producer: Adam Goldberg
 Produced by: Jarinus (Linus of Hollywood & Jaret Reddick)
 Recorded at: Panhandle House Studios – Denton, TX, The Daycare – Highland Village, TX The Lair – LA, CA and the Tacklebox – Hollywood, CA
 Mixed by: Jay Ruston
 Mastered by: Paul Logus
 Management: Mike Swinford & Paul Nugent at Rainmakers Artists
 Marketing Champ: Sarah Steinbrecher
 Package Design: Brad Bond
 Photography by: Will Bolton

References

External Links
 
Songs People Actually Liked - Volume 1 - The First 10 Years 1994-2003 Official Campaign

2015 compilation albums
Bowling for Soup albums